The 758th Tank Battalion was a tank battalion of the United States Army that served during World War II. The first armored unit to consist of African-American soldiers, the 758th was formed in 1941 and served in Italy.

History
On 13 January 1941, the U.S. Army established the 78th Tank Battalion, the first black armored unit. In March 1941 the tankers reported to Fort Knox, Kentucky, to begin armored warfare training. On 8 May 1941 at Fort Knox, Kentucky the 78th Tank Battalion was re-designated as the 758th Tank Battalion (Light). It was the first of three units that would form the all-black 5th Tank Group. The 758th trained in mechanized warfare using the M5 light tank. One of the battalion's more notable members was future baseball star Jackie Robinson. Robinson was transferred to the unit from the 761st Tank Battalion after an incident in which he refused to move to the back of a  bus (a bus contracted by the military which was not requiring segregation. The incident escalated to courts-marshal and wrongful allegations against Robinson). The 758th was permanently attached to the 92nd Infantry Division until 22 September 1945 when the unit was deactivated.
The unit's insignia is the head of a black African elephant with large white tusks accompanied by the motto, "We Pierce".

Legacy
The 758th was re-designated as the 64th Heavy Tank Battalion from 1949 to 1957. Today the unit exists as the 1st Battalion, 64th Armor Regiment assigned to the 1st Armored Brigade Combat Team of the 3rd Infantry Division. The 1–64th has served with distinction in several armed conflicts including Operation Desert Shield, Operation Desert Fox, Operation Iraqi Freedom, and Operation Enduring Freedom. The unit currently operates from Fort Stewart, Georgia.

The African elephant remains the insignia of the unit and has earned them the nickname "The Tusker Regiment". Today they are known as the "Desert Rogues."

See also
761st Tank Battalion
784th Tank Battalion

References

 

African-American history of the United States military
Battalions of the United States Army in World War II
Military units and formations established in 1941
Tank battalions of the United States Army